
Gmina Bojszowy is a rural gmina (administrative district) in Bieruń-Lędziny County, Silesian Voivodeship, in southern Poland.

Villages
Gmina Bojszowy contains the villages and settlements of Bojszowy, Bojszowy Nowe, Jedlina, Międzyrzecze and Świerczyniec.

Neighbouring gminas
Gmina Bojszowy is bordered by the towns of Bieruń and Tychy, and by the gminas of Kobiór, Miedźna, Oświęcim and Pszczyna.

References

Bojszowy
Bieruń-Lędziny County